Soul of the Bible is the second collaborative studio album by the Nat Adderley Sextet and Rick Holmes, presented by Julian "Cannonball" Adderley. It was released as a follow-up to Soul Zodiac through Capitol Records in 1972. Recording sessions took place at Capitol Records Studio in Hollywood, California with production handled by David Axelrod and Cannonball Adderley.

The album features narration from Rick Holmes and contributions from the sextet: Nat Adderley on cornet, George Duke and Nat Adderley Jr. on electric piano, Walter Booker on acoustic bass, Francisco Centeno on electric bass, and Roy McCurdy on drums, with guest appearances by vocalists Fleming Williams, Arthur Charma, Olga James and Stephanie Spruill, and percussionists Airto Moreira, King Errisson, Mayuto Correa and Octavio Bailly, Jr.

Track listing

Personnel

Nathaniel Carlyle Adderley – cornet
George Duke – electric piano, piano
Walter Booker – acoustic bass
Roy McCurdy – drums
Francisco Centeno – electric bass
Nathaniel E. Adderley, Jr. – piano, electric piano
Rick Holmes – narration
Julian "Cannonball" Adderley – alto saxophone, soprano saxophone, arrangement, presenter, producer
Fleming Williams – vocals (track 4)
Arthur Charma – vocals (track 8)
Olga James – vocals (track 13)
Stephanie Spruill – vocals (track 14)
Airto Moreira – percussion
"King" Errisson Pallman Johnson – percussion
Mayuto Correa – percussion
Octavio Bailly Jr – percussion
David Axelrod – producer
Gene Hicks – engineering
Jay Ranellucci – engineering
John Hoernle – art direction
Roy Kohara – design
Leroy Brooks – photography

References

External links

soul of the bible on Cannonball Adderley's website

1972 albums
Nat Adderley albums
Capitol Records albums
Albums produced by Cannonball Adderley
Albums produced by David Axelrod (musician)
Cannonball Adderley albums
George Duke albums